Sticks and Stones is the debut studio album of American country music artist Tracy Lawrence. Released in 1991 on Atlantic Records, it produced four singles: the title track, "Today's Lonely Fool", "Runnin' Behind", and "Somebody Paints the Wall", which peaked at #1, #3, #4, and #8, respectively, on the Billboard Hot Country Singles & Tracks (now Hot Country Songs) charts between 1991 and 1993.

The track "Paris, Tennessee" was later recorded by Dennis Robbins (one of the co-writers) on his 1992 album Man with a Plan and by Kenny Chesney on his 1995 album All I Need to Know. "Somebody Paints the Wall" was previously recorded by Josh Logan on his 1988 album of the same name, from which it was released as a single that year.

Track listing

Personnel
From Sticks and Stones liner notes.
Musicians
Tracy Lawrence - lead vocals
Bruce Bouton - steel guitar, Dobro
Mark Casstevens - acoustic guitar, harmonica
Liana Manis - background vocals
Brent Rowan - electric guitar
Milton Sledge - drums on all tracks except "Between Us"
Gary W. Smith - keyboards, piano, synthesizer
Joe Spivey - fiddle
James Stroud - drums on "Between Us"
Glenn Worf - bass guitar
Curtis Young - background vocals

Technical
Milan Bogdan - digital editing
Brian Hardin - mixing
Russ Martin - recording
Pat McMacon - recording, mixing
Glenn Meadows - mastering
Lynn Peterzell - recording
Billy Sherrill - recording
James Stroud - production

Chart performance

References

1991 debut albums
Atlantic Records albums
Tracy Lawrence albums
Albums produced by James Stroud